Road signs in Estonia ensure that transport vehicles move safely and orderly, as well as to inform the participants of traffic built-in graphic icons. These icons are governed by the Vienna Convention on Road Traffic and Vienna Convention on Road Signs and Signals. The system is covered in Liiklusmärkide ja teemärgiste tähendused ning nõuded fooridele and the standards document EVS 613:2001 Traffic signs.

Since Estonia was part of the Soviet Union, Estonia used the Soviet road sign standard before adopting its own road sign standard. After the declaration of independence of Estonia from the Soviet Union and the subsequent collapse of the Soviet Union, it became necessary to create its own standard for road signs in Estonia. Unlike most post-Soviet states, modern road signs in Estonia look different from those used in neighbouring Russia, Ukraine, Belarus, Lithuania.

Road sign

Warning signs

Priority signs

Prohibitory signs

Mandatory signs

Special regulation signs

References

Estonia